HMS Ontario  was a British warship that sank in a storm in Lake Ontario on 31 October 1780, during the American Revolutionary War. The shipwreck was discovered in 2008. Ontario was found largely intact and very well preserved in the cold water. The wreck discoverers asserted that "the 80-foot sloop of war is the oldest shipwreck and the only fully intact British warship ever found in the Great Lakes."

History 

Ontario was built in 1780 on Carleton Island, a major base in the St Lawrence River for the British during the Revolutionary War, but now part of New York. She was operated by the Royal Navy for the Provincial Marine in the capacity of an armed transport.

At the time, Ontario was the largest British warship to sail on the Great Lakes. She was launched just five months before she sank, and was used to ferry troops, supplies and prisoners from one remote part of New York to another.  She never saw battle.

Sinking
Ontario sank in a storm on 31 October 1780 while underway from Fort Niagara to Oswego. Approximately 80 men perished with the ship, comprising an estimated 31 sailors (two of whom were officers), three members of the Royal Artillery (one being an officer), three privates and one officer of the 8th (King's) Regiment of Foot, 30 men of the 34th (Cumberland) Regiment of Foot (one being an officer, two serjeants, one corporal, one drummer and 30 privates), two rangers, one passenger and four Native Americans. News of the sinking of Ontario was kept quiet for a number of years to hide the naval loss.

Search and discovery 

Side-scan sonar technology was used in the search of HMS Ontario in late May 2008. A promising wreck was found between Niagara and Rochester, New York in an area of Lake Ontario where the depth exceeds . The high resolution images showed the remains of two crow's nests on each mast, strongly suggesting that the sunken vessel was the brig-sloop Ontario. Due to the depth limitations for diving on this shipwreck, a remotely operated underwater vehicle was deployed and confirmed the identity of the ship in early June 2008.

Kennard and Scoville believe that the cold, fresh water of Lake Ontario, combined with a lack of light and oxygen, have slowed decomposition and account for the ship being found largely intact, despite being on the bottom for 230 years.  The shipwreck's discoverers have notified the New York State Office of Historic Preservation, however the exact location of the wreck has not been publicly disclosed. The wreck is still property of the United Kingdom and is a war grave.

See also
 , a well-preserved older shipwreck in Lake George

Notes

Further reading

External links
 Great Lakes Historical Society
 msnbc Report
 

Brig-sloops of the Royal Navy
Shipwrecks of Lake Ontario
Maritime incidents in 1780
1780 ships
Provincial Marine